Ski simulators are training systems for skiers and snowboarders.  They have the advantage of portability and can be placed indoors, permitting training to be done in any season.

There are many revolving carpet ski simulators and indoor ski slope carpets around the world.  They can be used for introductory training or to improve on and hone skills for expert skiers, especially in the off season.

Balance, control and strength are learned by practice and actively doing training drills and lessons on the ski simulators.

Endless slope
An endless slope is a sloped treadmill that allows skiers and snowboarders to refine form and strengthen muscles. Practicing on this treadmill that simulates snow allows carving, edging, pressuring, steering, and balance on skis or a snowboard, allowing the rider to experience the same muscle workout as on the mountain while developing the skills needed to gracefully move on snow.

An alpine skiing simulator, is a conveyor, having an inclined surface with the moving multilayer carpet, made out of the high-technology composite material. The band’s movement is directed upwards of the inclined surface towards the skier. Using a remote control, an instructor can set up different skiing conditions. For safety reasons the simulator has a smooth start and a smooth stop of the carpet and emergency stop sensors.

To ensure good slipping performance the upper working layer of the carpet is moistened with water, sending a signal from a remote control. In addition to that, if the slipping performance needs to be increased, it is possible to treat the working layer of the carpet with a special concentrate.

See also
Indoor ski slope
Ski school
Alpine Racer

References

Skiing equipment
Skiing techniques